Desmond King   (born 1957) is the Andrew W Mellon professor of American Government at Nuffield College, University of Oxford. King was elected to the American Philosophical Society in 2022.

Biography
King grew up in Dublin and graduated from Trinity College Dublin with a First in political science and was awarded the Bastable Prize.  He went on to carry out his postgraduate studies at Northwestern University, where he worked with Ted Robert Gurr, Alexander Hicks and Jane Mansbridge. Following the completion of his PhD, he was appointed as a lecturer at the University of Edinburgh, later moving to an Official Fellowship in Politics at St John's College, Oxford.  He was awarded his DLitt from the University of Oxford.  King is an elected fellow of the British Academy and the American Academy of Arts and Sciences and several other national academies including the Academia Europaea, the Royal Irish Academy, the Royal Historical Society, the Royal Society of Arts and the Academy of Social Sciences. He is an Emeritus Fellow of St John's College, Oxford.

Principal publications

Books
1. Separate and Unequal: African Americans and the US Federal Government, Clarendon Press, 1995. 

2. Actively Seeking Work?: The Politics of Unemployment and Welfare Policy in the United States and Great Britain, University of Chicago Press, 1995. 

3. In the Name of Liberalism: Illiberal Social Policy in the USA and Britain, Oxford University Press, 1999. 

4. Making Americans: Immigration, Race and the Origins of the Diverse Democracy, Harvard University Press, 2000. 

5. The Liberty of Strangers: Making the American Nation, Oxford University Press, 2005. 

6. Still a House Divided: Race and Politics in Obama's America, Princeton University Press, 2011. 

7. Sterilized by the State: Eugenics, Race, and the Population Scare in Twentieth-Century North America, Cambridge University Press, 2013. 

8. Fed Power: How Finance Wins, Oxford University Press, 2016.

References

Fellows of Nuffield College, Oxford
Academics of the University of Oxford
British political scientists
1957 births
Living people
Members of the American Philosophical Society